Harvest Christian Academy is a private Christian school in Elgin, Illinois, United States. Harvest Christian Academy is a ministry of Harvest Bible Chapel, a church that is located on several campuses in the Chicago area. The school has students ranging from preschool to high school. As of September 2014, the number of students enrolled at Harvest Christian Academy from preschool to grade 12 totaled 650, the number of full-time and part-time staff totaled 72, and the size of the facilities totaled 80 acres and over 200,000 square feet. The school was founded in August 2004.

The ethnic diversity of Harvest Christian Academy is significantly less than that of the state average in Illinois. Compared to the state average rate of 51% White students enrolled, Harvest Christian Academy has an 87% rate of White students. Both the Hispanic and Black communities, which on average in Illinois represent 24% and 18% of student enrollment respectively (the second and third largest ethnic groups), are only represented by 4% and 2% of the enrolled population at the private school.

References

External links

Christian schools in Illinois
Elgin, Illinois
Schools in Kane County, Illinois
Private high schools in Illinois
Private elementary schools in Illinois
Private middle schools in Illinois